Strange Cargo may refer to:

 Strange Cargo (1929 film)
 Strange Cargo (1936 film) 
 Strange Cargo (1940 film), starring Clark Gable and Joan Crawford
 Strange Cargo (William Orbit album)
 Strange Cargo II, follow-up album by William Orbit
 Strange Cargo III, follow-up album by William Orbit
 Strange Cargo Hinterland, follow-up album by William Orbit
 Strange Cargo (David Van Tieghem album)
 Strange Cargo (aircraft), a B-29 Superfortress modified to carry the atomic bomb in World War II.
 Strange Cargo, a novel by Jeffrey E. Barlough